Dagmar of Denmark may refer to:

 Dagmar of Bohemia (1186–1212), Queen Consort of Denmark, wife of King Valdemar II of Denmark
 Princess Dagmar of Denmark (1890–1961), daughter of Frederick VIII of Denmark and his wife, Princess Louise of Sweden and Norway 
 Maria Feodorovna (Dagmar of Denmark) (1847–1928), Empress Consort of Russia

See also
Dagmar (given name)
Dagmar (disambiguation)